Lincoln High School is a public high school that serves the city and its immediate suburbs of Manitowoc, Wisconsin. USA. The school serves students in grades 9 through 12, with an enrollment of roughly 1,200. Constructed in 1923, Lincoln High School was designed by the Chicago-based firm of Perkins, Fellows, & Hamilton and its campus plan was designed by Jens Jensen. It is located on Roeff's Hill, along scenic Lake Michigan. The gothic-style building occupies  on the south side of the city. School colors are red and white. The school's official team name is the "Shipbuilders", however, "Ships" is most often used.

History
The original building was finished in 1923, making Lincoln High School the oldest standing public high school in the state of Wisconsin. Since its completion, there have been eight renovations or additions to the school. The first was in 1930, with the addition of a pool. The west wing and third floor were added in 1942, followed by a first-floor library wing, a music wing, and a cafeteria wing in 1955. In 1956 the auditorium underwent its first major renovation. Built in 1961 was the John F. Kennedy Physical Education Center with a new girls' locker room. The original technology education wing was added in 1983. From 1996 to 2000, construction of a $16.5 million renovation and addition took place. These improvements included the addition of a new gymnasium and a new swimming pool to the J.F.K. Center, a new science lab wing, and an overhaul of the auditorium. In 2010, the floors, walls and bleachers in the J.F.K. Fieldhouse were renovated.

Athletics
Lincoln won the state championship in boys' cross country in 1929.

Notable alumni
 Art Albrecht, former Wisconsin Badgers and NFL player
 Mike Bare, Wisconsin state representative
 Dale Bolle, Wisconsin state representative
 Charles Daellenbach, founder and tuba with Canadian Brass
 Don Davey, NFL defensive tackle 1991–98
 Doug Free, player for NFL's Dallas Cowboys 2007–16
 Eugene S. Kaufman, Wisconsin state representative
 Jim Krueger, musician
 Les Kuplic, professional basketball player
 Henry C. Schadeberg, U.S. congressman
 Lisa K. Stark, Deputy Chief Judge of the Wisconsin Court of Appeals (2015–present)
 Susan Bowers Vergeront, Wisconsin State Representative
 R. T. Wallen, artist  
 Jon Whitcomb, artist, illustrator 
 Francis A. Yindra, Wisconsin state senator

References

External links 
 Lincoln High School

Public high schools in Wisconsin
International Baccalaureate schools in Wisconsin
Educational institutions established in 1923
Schools in Manitowoc County, Wisconsin
1923 establishments in Wisconsin